This is a complete list of electric utilities in the Philippines. There are 152 electric utilities in the country.

List

See also 
 List of companies of the Philippines
 List of power plants in the Philippines

Notes

References

External links 
Distribution Utility (DU) Profile

 
 
Electric
Philippines
Philippines